The South Africa national women's cricket team toured England in 2000, playing five women's One Day Internationals.

One Day International series

1st ODI

2nd ODI

3rd ODI

4th ODI

5th ODI

Tour matches

50-over match: South Africa women v England A women

50-over match: South Africa women v England A women

References

2000 in South African cricket
2000 in English cricket
Women's cricket tours of England
South African cricket tours of England
International cricket competitions from 1997–98 to 2000
England
2000 in English women's sport
2000 in South African women's sport
2000 in women's cricket
June 2000 sports events in the United Kingdom
July 2000 sports events in the United Kingdom